MZ may refer to:

Arts and entertainment
 MZ, a French rap band formed by members of Les Sages Poètes de la Rue
 MZ (formerly Machine Zone), developer of Game of War: Fire Age and other mobile video games
 Marvel Zombies, a Marvel Comics limited series published in 2005–2006
 Mirmo Zibang!, an anime television series
 Mitteldeutsche Zeitung, a German newspaper
 Mz,  Short for Muzi slang word for buddy, pal, mate.

Places
 Mozambique (ISO 3166-1 country code MZ)
 .mz, the country code top level domain (ccTLD) for Mozambique
 Mizoram, a state in northeast India (ISO 3166-2 code IN-MZ)

Technology

Cameras and optics
 MZ, a series of single-lens reflex cameras by Pentax
 Mach–Zehnder interferometer, an optical device for using light to determine phase shift variations

Computing
 MZ executable, a file type in Microsoft MS-DOS
 Mark Zbikowski, a former Microsoft programmer whose initials mark the first two bytes of all executable files in DOS and Windows (16- and 32-bit versions)
 Mausezahn, a fast network traffic generator
 Sharp MZ series, a line of personal computers by Sharp

Transportation
 Merpati Nusantara Airlines, an Indonesia-based airline (IATA code MZ)
 MZ Motorrad- und Zweiradwerk GmbH, a German motorcycle manufacturer
 DSB Class MZ, a series of diesel-electric locomotives built 1967–1978 for Danish railway company Danske Statsbaner (DSB)
 Makedonski Železnici, the government-owned railway company of Macedonia

Other uses
 Mishtara Zva'it, the Military Police Corps of Israel
 Mixe–Zoque languages

See also
 Ms., a default form of address for women regardless of their marital status